Princess Hwayu (29 September 1740 – 21 May 1777) (Hangul: 화유옹주, Hanja: 和柔翁主), was a royal princess of the Joseon Dynasty and the tenth daughter of Yeongjo of Joseon.

Life 
Princess Hwayu was born on 29 September 1740 as the daughter of King Yeongjo and his concubine, Royal Consort Gwi-in of the Pungyang Jo clan. Her personal name was not recorded in history. She received the title Hwayu in 1746.

On 5 December 1752, the marriage between Princess Hwayu and Hwang In-jeon was decided, but the ceremony was stopped because of the death of Princess Hwahyeop.

On February 27, 1753 (29th year of King Yeongjo), she married Hwang In-jeon. After the wedding, King Yeongjo continued to visit the residence of Princess Hwayu.

Princess Hwayu and her eldest son suffered from boils. She died on 21 May 1777 and was buried with her husband in Bucheon.

References 

Princesses of Joseon
1740 births
1777 deaths
18th-century Korean people